Wie erziehe ich meine Eltern? is a German television series.

See also
List of German television series

External links
 

2002 German television series debuts
2009 German television series endings
German comedy television series
German children's television series
German-language television shows